This are the results of 2017 BWF World Senior Championships' 35+ events.

Men's singles

Seeds

 Stanislav Pukhov (champion, gold medal)
 Jan Fröhlich (second round)
 Naruenart Chuaymak (final, silver medal)
 Morten Eilby Rasmussen (quarterfinals)

Finals

Top half

Section 1

Section 2

Bottom half

Section 3

Section 4

Women's singles

Seeds

 Noriko Sanada (semifinals, bronze medal)
 Olga Arkhangelskaya (champion, gold medal)

Group A

Group B

Group C

Group D

Finals

Men's doubles

Seeds

 Rupesh Kumar K. T. / Sanave Thomas (champions, gold medal)
 J. B. S. Vidyadhar / Valiyaveetil Diju (final, silver medal)
 Naruenart Chuaymak / Thitipong Lapoe (semifinals, bronze medal)
 Hosemari Fujimoto / Matsumoto Masayuki (semifinals, bronze medal)

Finals

Top half

Section 1

Section 2

Bottom half

Section 3

Section 4

Women's doubles

Seeds

 Rie Matsumoto / Noriko Sanada (final, silver medal)
 Olga Arkhangelskaya / Maria Koloskova (champions, gold medal)

Group A

Group B

Finals

Mixed doubles

Seeds

 Alexey Katkov / Olga Arkhangelskaya (second round)
 Morten Eilby Rasmussen /  Lynne Swan (semifinals, bronze medal)
 Felix Hoffman / Claudia Vogelgsang (final, silver medal)
 Matsumoto Masayuki / Rie Matsumoto (second round)

Finals

Top half

Section 1

Section 2

Bottom half

Section 3

Section 4

References

Men's singles
Results

Women's singles
Group A Results
Group B Results
Group C Results
Group D Results
Finals Results

Men's doubles
Results

Women's doubles
Group A Results
Group B Results
Finals Results

Mixed doubles
Results

2017 BWF World Senior Championships